Makassarese ( or ), sometimes called Makasar, Makassar, or Macassar, is a language of the Makassarese people, spoken in South Sulawesi province of Indonesia. It is a member of the South Sulawesi group of the Austronesian language family, and thus closely related to, among others, Buginese.

Phonology
The following description of Makassarese phonology is based on Jukes (2005).

Vowels 

Consonants

Makassarese consonants except the glottal stop can be geminated. Some instances of these might result from Proto-Malayo-Polynesian schwa phoneme *ə (now merged into a), which left gemination into the following consonant (*bəli → *bəlli → balli "to buy, price", compare Indonesian beli, contrasting with Makassarese bali "to oppose").

  is written  before a vowel,  before  and 
  is written 
  is written 
  is written 
  only occurs in loanwords
 The glottal stop  only occurs in syllable-final position.

Phonotactics
All consonants except for  can appear in initial position.

These clusters also arise through sandhi across morpheme boundaries.

The geminate cluster  is only found in root-internal position and cannot be accounted for by the above rules.

Sequences of like vowels are contracted to a single vowel, e.g.  'to wash' + -ang 'nominalizing suffix' >  'laundry',  'small' + -i 'third person' >  'it is small'.

Current writing systems
Although Makassarese is now often written in Latin script, it is still widely written using Lontara script, which once was used also to write important documents in Bugis and Mandar, two related languages from Sulawesi.

Examples

Some common words/phrases in the Makasar language, transcribed in the Latin script, are as follows ( = glottal stop):

Historical writing systems

Makassarese was historically written using Makasar script (also known as "Old Makassarese" or "Makassarese bird script" in English-language scholarly works).
It was used for official purposes in the kingdoms of Makasar in the 17th century but ceased to be used by the 19th century, being replaced by Lontara script.

In spite of their quite distinctive appearance, both the Makasar and Lontara scripts are derived from the ancient Brahmi script of India. Like other descendants of that script, each consonant has an inherent vowel "a", which is not marked. Other vowels can be indicated by adding diacritics above, below, or on either side of each consonant.

Further, Makassarese was written in the Serang script, a variant of the Arabic-derived Jawi script. Texts written in the Serang script are relatively rare, and mostly appear in connection with Islam-related topics. Parts of the Makassar Annals, the chronicles of the Gowa and Tallo' kingdoms, were also written using the Serang script.

See also
 Makassan contact with Australia

Further reading

References

External links

 Makassar pronunciation and alphabet at Omniglot
 Lontara and Makassar scripts
 Lontara Alphabet in Unicode
 http://unicode-table.com/en/sections/buginese/

Languages of Sulawesi
South Sulawesi languages